Benjamin Boulenger (born 1 March 1990) is a French footballer who plays as a defender for Belgian club Francs Borains.

Career

Boulogne
Boulenger started his career with Division d'Honneur club Aulnoye before joining Boulogne. He was is initially a part of the reserve team, before being promoted to the first team competing in Ligue 2 ahead of the 2011–12 season. After a season where he mainly appeared as a substitute, he became a starter the following season in National after Boulogne's relegation.

Lens
After being contacted by Jocelyn Blanchard, Boulenger joined Ligue 2 club Lens in August 2013 on an amateur contract. He became a part of the club's reserve team playing in National 2. Boulenger made his professional debut for the first team on 11 November 2013 in a 2–2 away draw against Chamois Niortais, replacing Pablo Chavarría, and scoring his first goal a few seconds after coming on. 

Lens received a recruitment ban in 2014 due to irregularities in the club's proposed budget, which meant that Boulenger could not sign a professional contract. Alongside Samuel Atrous, he spent six months without a team and waited until December 2014 for a six-month contract to be offered and approved.

Sporting Charleroi
On 26 May 2015, he left Lens, who had just been relegated to Ligue 2, and signed with Belgian Pro League club Sporting Charleroi on a two-year deal with an option for an additional year. He made his debut for the club, as well as his European debut, on 23 July 2015, replacing Neeskens Kebano in the 68th minute of a 4–1 win in the UEFA Europa League over Beitar Jerusalem. A long-time reserve, he only made his league debut on 23 April 2016, during his club's 4–0 victory against Mechelen.

On 1 September 2017, Boulenger was sent on a one-season loan with an option to buy to OH Leuven competing in the second-tier Proximus League.

After returning to Sporting Charleroi, his situation did not improve and despite his contract running for one more season, until June 2019, he was placed in the reserve team and was asked to look for a new club. He failed to find a new club, and stayed with Charleroi until the expiry of his contract.

Seraing
Boulenger joined Seraing on 19 September 2019, signing a one-year contract with an option for another year with the club competing in the third-tier Belgian First Amateur Division. He was part of the team winning two promotions in a row, reaching the top level Belgian Pro League in 2021.

Francs Borains
In the summer of 2022, Boulenger signed with Francs Borains in the third-tier Belgian National Division 1.

References

External links 

1990 births
People from Maubeuge
Living people
French footballers
Association football defenders
US Boulogne players
RC Lens players
R. Charleroi S.C. players
Oud-Heverlee Leuven players
R.F.C. Seraing (1922) players
Francs Borains players
Ligue 2 players
Ligue 1 players
Championnat National players
Championnat National 2 players
Championnat National 3 players
Belgian Pro League players
Challenger Pro League players
Belgian National Division 1 players
French expatriate footballers
Expatriate footballers in Belgium
French expatriate sportspeople in Belgium
Sportspeople from Nord (French department)
Footballers from Hauts-de-France